Brown-Séquard syndrome (also known as Brown-Séquard's hemiplegia, Brown-Séquard's paralysis, hemiparaplegic syndrome, hemiplegia et hemiparaplegia spinalis, or spinal hemiparaplegia) is caused by damage to one half of the spinal cord, i.e. hemisection of the spinal cord resulting in paralysis and loss of proprioception on the same (or ipsilateral) side as the injury or lesion, and loss of pain and temperature sensation on the opposite (or contralateral) side as the lesion. It is named after physiologist Charles-Édouard Brown-Séquard, who first described the condition in 1850.

Causes
Brown-Séquard syndrome may be caused by injury to the spinal cord resulting from a spinal cord tumor, trauma [such as a fall or injury from gunshot or puncture to the cervical or thoracic spine], ischemia (obstruction of a blood vessel), or infectious or inflammatory diseases such as tuberculosis, or multiple sclerosis. In its pure form, it is rarely seen. The most common cause is penetrating trauma such as a gunshot wound or stab wound to the spinal cord. Decompression sickness may also be a cause of Brown-Séquard syndrome.

The presentation can be progressive and incomplete. It can advance from a typical Brown-Séquard syndrome to complete paralysis. It is not always permanent and progression or resolution depends on the severity of the original spinal cord injury and the underlying pathology that caused it in the first place.

Pathophysiology

The hemisection of the cord results in a lesion of each of the three main neural systems:
 the principal upper motor neuron pathway of the corticospinal tract
 one or both dorsal columns
 the spinothalamic tract

As a result of the injury to these three main brain pathways the patient will present with three lesions:
 The corticospinal lesion produces spastic paralysis on the same side of the body below the level of the lesion (due to loss of moderation by the UMN). At the level of the lesion, there will be flaccid paralysis of the muscles supplied by the nerve of that level (since lower motor neurons are affected at the level of the lesion).
 The lesion to fasciculus gracilis or fasciculus cuneatus (dorsal column) results in ipsilateral loss of vibration and proprioception (position sense) as well as loss of all sensation of fine touch.
 The loss of the spinothalamic tract leads to pain and temperature sensation being lost from the contralateral side beginning one or two segments below the lesion.

In addition, if the lesion occurs above T1 of the spinal cord it will produce ipsilateral Horner's syndrome with involvement of the oculosympathetic pathway.

Diagnosis
Magnetic resonance imaging (MRI) is the imaging of choice in spinal cord lesions.

Brown-Séquard syndrome is an incomplete spinal cord lesion characterized by findings on clinical examination which reflect hemisection of the spinal cord (cutting the spinal cord in half on one or the other side). It is diagnosed by finding motor (muscle) paralysis on the same (ipsilateral) side as the lesion and deficits in pain and temperature sensation on the opposite (contralateral) side. This is called ipsilateral hemiplegia and contralateral pain and temperature sensation deficits. The loss of sensation on the opposite side of the lesion is because the nerve fibers of the spinothalamic tract (which carry information about pain and temperature) crossover once they meet the spinal cord from the peripheries.

Classification
Any presentation of spinal injury that is an incomplete lesion (hemisection) can be called a partial Brown-Séquard or incomplete Brown-Séquard syndrome.

Brown-Séquard syndrome is characterized by loss of motor function (i.e. hemiparaplegia), loss of vibration sense and fine touch, loss of proprioception (position sense), loss of two-point discrimination, and signs of weakness on the ipsilateral (same side) of the spinal injury. This is a result of a lesion affecting the dorsal column-medial lemniscus tract, well localized (deep) touch, conscious proprioception, vibration, pressure and 2-point discrimination, and the corticospinal tract, which carries motor fibers. On the contralateral (opposite side) of the lesion, there will be a loss of pain and temperature sensation and crude touch 1 or 2 segments below the level of the lesion via the Spinothalamic Tract of the Anterolateral System. Bilateral (both sides) ataxia may also occur if the ventral spinocerebellar tract and dorsal spinocerebellar tract are affected.

Crude touch, pain and temperature fibers are carried in the spinothalamic tract. These fibers decussate at the level of the spinal cord. Therefore, a hemi-section lesion to the spinal cord will demonstrate loss of these modalities on the contralateral side of the lesion, while preserving them on the ipsilateral side. Upon touching this side, the patient will not be able to localize where they were touched, only that they were touched. This is because fine touch fibers are carried in the dorsal column-medial lemniscus pathway. The fibers in this pathway decussate at the level of the medulla. Therefore, a hemi-section lesion of the spinal cord will demonstrate loss of fine touch on ipsilateral side (preserved on the contralateral side) and crude touch (destruction of the decussated spinothalamic fibers from the contralateral side) on the contralateral side.

Pure Brown-Séquard syndrome is associated with the following:
 Interruption of the lateral corticospinal tracts:
 Ipsilateral spastic paralysis below the level of the lesion
 Babinski sign ipsilateral to lesion
 Abnormal reflexes and Babinski sign may not be present in acute injury
 Interruption of posterior white column:
 Ipsilateral loss of tactile discrimination, vibratory, and position sensation below the level of the lesion
 Interruption of lateral spinothalamic tracts:
 Contralateral loss of pain and temperature sensation. This usually occurs 2–3 segments below the level of the lesion.

Treatment
Treatment is directed at the pathology causing the paralysis. If the syndrome is caused by a spinal fracture, this should be identified and treated appropriately. Although steroids may be used to decrease cord swelling and inflammation, the usual therapy for spinal cord injury is expectant.

Epidemiology
Brown-Séquard syndrome is rare as the trauma would have to be something that damaged the nerve fibres on just one half of the spinal cord.

History
Charles-Édouard Brown-Séquard studied the anatomy and physiology of the spinal cord. He described this injury after observing spinal cord trauma which happened to farmers while cutting sugar cane in Mauritius.
French physician, Paul Loye, attempted to confirm Brown-Séquard's observations on the nervous system by experimentation with decapitation of dogs and other animals and recording the extent of each animal's movement after decapitation.

Notes

Sources

External links

 Case studies of Brown-Séquard syndrome

Spinal cord disorders
Syndromes affecting the nervous system